Buenos Aires is a coastal town and resort located in Víctor Larco Herrera district, in  Trujillo, Peru. This locality is subdivided into three zones: Buenos Aires South, extending to the border with the Moche district, Buenos Aires Central limiting with Vista Alegre by east and the sector called Buenos Aires North extending up to the limit with Huanchaco. In the north side of this town is located the headquarters of the Municipality of Victor Larco Herrera district.

History
Located in the southwest of Trujillo city was formed as a resort since the late nineteenth century. Appreciated for its scenery and cool weather and mild, was named Buenos Aires by Don Víctor Larco Herrera, illustrious benefactor of the district which now bears his name, who in 1915 established the railroad (and later a double track) between Trujillo and the resort of Buenos Aires, providing transport for people who lived there.

Gallery

Geography

Climate

Places of interest
Association of Breeders and Owners of Paso Horses in La Libertad  
Santa Rosa Church
Moche River

See also

Trujillo
Historic Centre of Trujillo
Chan Chan
Puerto Chicama
Chimu
Pacasmayo beach
Marcahuamachuco
Wiracochapampa
Moche
Víctor Larco Herrera District
 Vista Alegre
Huanchaco
Las Delicias beach
La Libertad Region
Trujillo Province, Peru
Virú culture
Lake Conache
Marinera Festival
Trujillo Spring Festival
Wetlands of Huanchaco
Salaverry
Salaverry beach
Puerto Morín

References

External links

Map of Buenos Aires
"Huaca de la luna and Huaca del sol"
"Huacas del Sol y de la Luna Archaeological Complex", Official Website
Information on El Brujo Archaeological Complex
Chan Chan World Heritage Site, UNESCO
Chan Chan conservation project
Website about Trujillo, Reviews, Events, Business Directory

Multimedia
 
 
 
 Gallery pictures by Panoramio, Includes Geographical information by various authors
Colonial Trujillo photos

Beaches of Trujillo, Peru
Localities of Trujillo, Peru